is a Japanese seinen manga by Shūzō Oshimi that was serialized in the manga magazine, Manga Action. Drifting Net Cafe is a science fiction mystery involving a group of patrons trapped in an internet café, which has become a strange universe of its own. The story focuses primarily on the relationship between Koichi Toki, a salaryman who leads a trouble-free but unexciting life, and Kaho Tono, his first love whom he never forgot.

The manga was adapted into a TBS television series on April 15, 2009, and stars Atsushi Itō as Koichi Toki.

Plot
Koichi Toki is an office worker or salaryman with a wife. He works hard to bring food home and leads a rather simple and boring life. During a work trip, he decides to spend time in an internet cafe, where he meets an ex-schoolmate after not seeing each other for a while. In the same cafe, several clients begin to have problems with their computers and the cellular signal disappears. The group of clients together with the manager of the place, Toki and his partner are trapped, to discover that they are in a mysterious place that is not Japan. The group suffers from disagreements, several escalations of anger and despair trying to survive while Toki and his friend's relationship progresses little by little.

Manga
The manga was serialized in Futabasha's Manga Action and the 63 chapters were compiled into 7 volumes from February 28, 2009 to June 28, 2011. The defunct American publisher JManga licensed the manga and released the first volume in August 2011. The name of the manga is a reference to Kazuo Umezu's The Drifting Classroom, which it is a retelling of. The manga has also been published in Spain by Milky Way Ediciones.

Television series
The series was released in a 4-disc DVD boxset on August 5, 2009. The ending theme「Brave Heart (Remix)」by MAY'S was released as a single on April 22, 2009.

Cast
 Atsushi Itō – Koichi Toki
 KIKI – Kaho Tono
 Reina Asami – Yukie Toki
 Shinpei Takagi – Atsushi
 Masahiro Toda – Osawa
 Mai Takahashi – Kazumi Kato
 Takahiro Hojo – Takashi Matsuda
 Reo Yoshitake – Kameda
 Kazumi Urano – Miku
 Hidekazu Nagae – Terasawa
 Yuko Mano – Sachiko Imai
 Go Riju – Kensuke Kajimachi
 Miyu Watanabe – Saori Mizuno
 Shusuke Tsumura – Satomura

Episode information

Special Rerun

Reception
Katherine Dacey of Manga Bookshelf was disappointed in how the first volume of the manga stood in comparison to The Drifting Classroom, saying the horror was not as well-executed, but felt that the manga had better pacing and artwork: "Long-time fans of Classroom are likely to find Oshimi's update slick but soulless, as it relies more heavily on low-budget disaster movies than the original source material for its characters and conflicts." Sean Gaffney of A Case Suitable for Treatment felt that the horror aspect was pulled off well in the first volume, but was turned off by the excessive violence and sex: "It's as sordid as it sounds, and made me feel ill... [It] didn't take long for morality to erode, much like [The Drifting Classroom]."

References

External links
 Official website: TV Series 
 MBS website 
 

2009 Japanese television series debuts
2009 Japanese television series endings
2009 manga
Futabasha manga
Japanese drama television series
Mystery anime and manga
Romance anime and manga
Science fiction anime and manga
Seinen manga
Shūzō Oshimi
TBS Television (Japan) dramas